The Chapple and MacArthur Avenues Residential Historic District is a residential neighborhood and Historic District in Ashland, Wisconsin, and is listed on the National Register of Historic Places.

It comprises 61 contributing properties, including the 1888 Shingle-style Heydlauff house, the 1891 Queen Anne/Shingle-style Charles Lamoreux house (at left), the 1893 Gothic Revival Swedish Evangelical Lutheran Church, the 1894 Stick style Lyon house, the 1904 American Foursquare Parish house, the 1911 Craftsman Frank Lamoreux house, the 1924 Dutch Colonial Revival Garnich house, and the 1933 Georgian Revival Metternich house.

There is another Historic District listed on the National Register of Historic Places in Ashland, the West Second Street Historic District. Ashland also has a local register of historic properties, which identifies buildings that are significant to local history.

See also

National Register of Historic Places listings in Ashland County, Wisconsin

References

External links
Extensive history of the District, from www.livingplaces.com
City of Ashland Website

National Register of Historic Places in Ashland County, Wisconsin
Houses on the National Register of Historic Places in Wisconsin
Historic districts on the National Register of Historic Places in Wisconsin